The Empire Builder is a train route in the United States.

Empire Builder may also refer to:
 Empire Builder (board game)
 Empire Builder (album), by Laura Gibson
 SS Empire Builder, an Empire ship
 James J. Hill or the Empire Builder, Canadian-American railroad executive

See also
The Empire Builders, 1924 film
Empire Builders (radio program), broadcast 1929-1931 
 World Builder (disambiguation)